Welcome to Mollywood may refer to:
Welcome to Mollywood, Molly Parkin's autobiography
Welcome to Mollywood, a provisional name for the American children's sitcom, Sonny with a Chance

See also
Welcome to Hollywood, a mockumentary released in 2000